Sadrul Miya Haque was a Nepalese politician, who won the Saptari-5 seat independently in the 2008 Constituent Assembly election as an independent candidate. Haque won the seat with 10603 votes.

Haque was murdered Bishanpur (Kalyanpur-2) in May 2013. He was 55 years old at the time.

References

Year of birth missing
2013 deaths
Nepalese Muslims
People murdered in Nepal
Nepalese murder victims

Members of the 1st Nepalese Constituent Assembly